Nida Pasha, better known as Nida Yasir, is a Pakistani television host, former actress and model known for her role as Saima in the television drama Hum Tum. She also hosts the morning television show Good Morning Pakistan at ARY Digital.

Family 
She is the daughter of television directors-producers Kazim Pasha and Fehmida Nasreen.

Career 
Yasir started her career as a producer and model. Later she joined ARY Digital when Shaista Wahidi accepted offer from Geo TV for a morning show and left ARY Digital. She is now hosting the morning show Good Morning Pakistan on ARY Digital . She also works in drama serials on different TV channels.

In 2015, Yasir produced her first feature film Wrong No., directed and also produced by her husband Yasir Nawaz.

Controversies 
In 2015, Yasir invited fellow actor Shabbir Jan on her show and during a game show, caused him to storm out, prompting the other guest Saud to go after him. Yasir later claimed that this was an act propagated to boost show ratings.

In 2020, in an interview with the parents of a rape victim, Yasir asked the couple insensitive questions regarding the rape and eventual murder. This was met with widespread criticism, with the hashtag #BanNidaYasir trending on Pakistani twitter-space.

Nida Yasir generated further controversy in 2021 when a 2016 clip from her morning show went viral on the internet. In the interview, she displayed a lack of background research by repeatedly asking questions that undermined the achievements of her guests, who were graduate students going to Formula student in USA.

Television

Host 
Good Morning Pakistan
GMP Shan-e-Suhoor

Producer 
 Baal Baal Bach Gaye

Actor

Films

As producer
 Wrong No. (2015)
Mehrunisa V lub u (2017)
Wrong No. 2 (2019)

Awards 
 Pakistan Media Award   2012 - Best morning show host (GMP) Good Morning Pakistan.
Pakistan Achievement Awards (PAA)    2019 - Best Morning Show Host (GMP) Good Morning Pakistan.

References

External links 
Good Morning Pakistan's official website
 

Living people
Pakistani female models
Pakistani television actresses
Pakistani television hosts
Pakistani television producers
Actresses from Karachi
21st-century Pakistani actresses
ARY Digital people
Women television producers
Women television journalists
Pakistani women journalists
Pakistani women television presenters
Date of birth missing (living people)
Year of birth missing (living people)